The mission of the New Jersey Department of the Treasury is to formulate and manage the state's budget, generate and collect revenues, disburse the appropriations used to operate New Jersey state government, manage the state's physical and financial assets, and provide statewide support services to state and local government agencies as well as the citizens of New Jersey. The department’s overriding goal is to ensure the most beneficial use of fiscal resources and revenues to meet critical needs, all within a policy framework set by the governor.

The Office of the State Treasurer is one of the oldest units of New Jersey state government, the first treasurer named in 1776, following adoption of the first Constitution of New Jersey.

State Treasurer of New Jersey
Liz Muoio, January 2018 to present 
Ford Scudder, November 2015 to January 2018 
Robert Romano, July 2015 to November 2015 
Andrew Sidamon-Eristoff, January 2010 to July 2015 
David Rousseau, January 2008 to January 2010
Michellene Davis, September 2007 to January 2008 
Bradley Abelow, January 2006 to August 2007
John McCormac, January 2002 to January 2006
Peter Lawrance, February 2001 to January 2002
Isabel Miranda, January 2001 
Ronald Machold, August 1999 to January 2001
James DiEleuterio, July 1997 to August 1999
Brian Clymer, January 1994 to June 1997
Samuel Crane, January 1992 to January 1994
Douglas Berman, January 1990 to January 1992
Feather O'Conner, January 1986 to January 1990
Michael Horn, March 1984 to January 1986
Kenneth Biederman, January 1982 to March 1984
Clifford Goldman, December 1976 to January 1982
Richard Leone, January 1974 to December 1976
William Marfuggi, January 1973 to January 1974
Katharine Elkus White, 1961 
John Kervick, July 1958 to January 1970
Aaron Neeld, May 1957 to July 1958
Archibald S. Alexander, January 1954 to May 1957
Walter Margetts, April 1949 to January 1954
John J. Dickerson, January 1949 to April 1949
Robert C. Hendrickson, 1942 to January 1949
Albert Middleton, 1928
William T. Read, 1916 to 1928
Edward Everett Grosscup, 1913 to 1916
Daniel Spader Voorhees, 1907 to 1913
Frank O. Briggs, 1902 to 1907
George B. Swain, 1894 to 1901.
John J. Toffey, 1875 to 1891.
Gershom Mott, 1875.
David Naar, 1865.
Stacy A. Paxon, 1845 to 1847.
James Mott, 1783 to 1799.
John Stevens, 1776 to 1779

Commission on Science, Innovation and Technology
In August 2018, Governor Phil Murphy signed legislation re-establishing the former New Jersey Commission on Science and Technology, which was originally created in 1985 and became non-operational in 2010. The  revitalized commission was established in, but not of, the Department of the Treasury. He named Beth Simone Noveck as chief innovation officer.

See also

List of company registers

References

External links
New Jersey Department of the Treasury

 
Treasury
Taxation in New Jersey
US state tax agencies